Whitbarrow is a hill in Cumbria, England. Designated a biological Site of Special Scientific Interest and national nature reserve, it forms part of the Morecambe Bay Pavements Special Area of Conservation due to its supporting some of the best European examples of natural limestone habitats. Part of the site is a local nature reserve called Whitbarrow Scar.

It is a mixture of woodland, grassland and limestone pavement. The hill is prominent from the A590 road with its steep limestone cliffs, laid down in the Carboniferous period some 350 million years ago. The main cliff faces are made up of rocks known as Dalton Beds, above which are Urswick Limestones, of which the limestone pavement (here and elsewhere around Morecambe Bay, including Hutton Roof Crags) has been formed.

Whitbarrow, like most of the Lake District, shows many signs of the last ice age, including glacial erratics (boulders left behind when the ice retreated), and the limestone pavement itself, formed when ice left bare limestone exposed to the elements which eroded it and left us with the grikes and clints we see today. The limestone has been used for many purposes including building, agricultural fertiliser, and production of millstones, but is now protected by law and it is an offence to remove any. Whitbarrow NNR is owned and managed by the Forestry Commission, Lake District National Park Authority and the Cumbria Wildlife Trust.

Much of Whitbarrow is covered in woodland, initially naturally and from 1919 following planting; the Forestry Commission now holds leases on parts of the hill. A variety of techniques are used to manage the woodland, including coppicing; the variety of methods adds to the range of wildlife resulting.

The summit of Whitbarrow Scar is known as Lord's Seat, and a   anticlockwise walk to here from Witherslack, returning along the valley to the west, forms a chapter in The Outlying Fells of Lakeland by Alfred Wainwright. He describes it as "the most beautiful [walk] in this book; beautiful it is every step of the way. ... All is fair to the eye on Whitbarrow."

References

Fells of the Lake District
Marilyns of England
National nature reserves in England
Sites of Special Scientific Interest in Cumbria
Local nature reserves in Cumbria
Nature reserves of the Cumbria Wildlife Trust